Racing for Holland is a Dutch motor racing team started by Jan Lammers in 1999. The team is initially specialised in endurance races such as 24 hours of Le Mans and FIA sportscars series. The team also participated in the A1 Grand Prix as the A1 Team The Netherlands. It would eventually continue as Racing Team Nederland under Ownership of Frits van Eerd and Jumbo

History
Racing for Holland was incepted in 1999 as Talkline Racing for Holland. The team would participate in that year's 24 Hours of Le Mans in collaboration with German Konrad Motorsport, with drivers Jan Lammers, Tom Coronel and Peter Kox, and Talkline serving as mainsponsor. Talkline would withdraw sponsorship after the 2000 race, in which the team was disqualified after Tom Coronel left the car for more than 30 meter to collect his lost rear tire, starting a struggle to find funding. In 2001 Racing for Holland for the first time took part in the 24 Hours of Le Mans without help of Konrad Motorsport, resulting again in a DNF. However, Racing for Holland were showing a fast pace ever since their debut on Le Mans and they finished for the first time in 2002, in 8th place, and a year later a best ever finish in 6th place.

Sportscar Racing

Racing for Holland has for many years campaigned a Dome S101 sportscar powered by a Judd engine in the FIA Sportscar Championship, Le Mans Series, and the most of all the 24 Hours of Le Mans, including a best of sixth place overall in 2003.

With the Dome-Judd combination, Racing for Holland was successful in winning the FIA Sportscar Championship in 2002 and 2003 after having finished third in 2001.  In the Le Mans Series, Racing for Holland has not had as much success, finishing ninth in the LMP1 standings in both 2005 and 2006.

Sponsors
Unable to find one major sponsor for the team after Talkline's withdraw from sponsorship, Jan Lammers started an unusual sponsor programme. Instead of a few major sponsors, he set out to find many minor sponsors. The team sold small square spaces on the car, either in white lettering on a black background or vice versa. This gives the car a chequered appearance with the only other notable colours being red, blue (colours of the Dutch flag) and orange (the colour of the Dutch royal house).

Later on, after the team's success in various events, the cars became more prominently styled with large orange or black and silver colours; however a hint of the chequered sponsorship squares always  remains visible.

Shortly before the 2006 FIFA World Cup, Racing For Holland liveried their cars for the 2006 24 Hours of Le Mans in the motif of a  soccer ball, having received support from Dutch soccer legend Johan Cruijff. The move was also intended to show their support for the Dutch team.

Complete series results

 T.C. = Teams' Championship position, DNF = Did Not Qualify, NC = Not Classified.

References

External links
 

Dutch auto racing teams
Auto racing teams established in 1999
Auto racing teams disestablished in 2009
1999 establishments in the Netherlands
A1 Grand Prix racing teams
FIA Sportscar Championship entrants
24 Hours of Le Mans teams
European Le Mans Series teams
Superleague Formula teams
2009 disestablishments in the Netherlands